Captain Julian Royds Gribble VC (5 January 1897 − 25 November 1918) was a British Army officer and an English recipient of the Victoria Cross (VC), the highest and most prestigious award for gallantry in the face of the enemy that can be awarded to British and Commonwealth forces.

Life
Born to George James Gribble and Norah Gribble (née Royds) of 34 Eaton Square in London. His siblings included Vivien Gribble, a wood engraver, who spent World War I in the Women's Land Army.

He was 21 years old, and a temporary captain in the 10th (S) Battalion, The Royal Warwickshire Regiment, British Army during the First World War when he performed a deed for which he was awarded the Victoria Cross on 23 March 1918 at Beaumetz, Hermies Ridge, France.

Citation

Death
He was taken prisoner and died of pneumonia at Niederzwehren Prisoner of War Camp in Germany, aged 21. Although he died 14 days after the end of the war, systems were not yet in place to repatriate those held prisoner.

He is commemorated on the War Memorial at Long Bredy in Dorset, close to Kingston Russell House, which had been purchased by his father in 1913. His sister Vivien designed a memorial window for him at Preston, Hertfordshire.

The medal
His VC was destroyed in a house fire and no replacement has been issued.

References

Monuments to Courage (David Harvey, 1999)
The Register of the Victoria Cross (This England, 1997)
VCs of the First World War - Spring Offensive 1918 (Gerald Gliddon, 1997)
T/CAPTAIN Julian Royds Gribble

1897 births
1918 deaths
Burials in Hesse
British World War I recipients of the Victoria Cross
Royal Warwickshire Fusiliers officers
British Army personnel of World War I
British military personnel killed in World War I
British World War I prisoners of war
World War I prisoners of war held by Germany
People from Belgravia
People educated at Eton College
Graduates of the Royal Military College, Sandhurst
British Army recipients of the Victoria Cross
Deaths from pneumonia in Germany
People from Henlow
Military personnel from London
Burials at Niederzwehren War Cemetery